The Gonzaga Bulldogs are an intercollegiate men's basketball program representing Gonzaga University. The school competes in the West Coast Conference in Division I of the National Collegiate Athletic Association (NCAA). The Gonzaga Bulldogs play home basketball games at the McCarthey Athletic Center in Spokane, Washington, on the university campus.

Gonzaga has had 15 of its players receive the WCC Player of the Year award, and two players, Frank Burgess in 1961 with 32.4 points per game, and Adam Morrison in 2006 with 28.1 points per game, have led the nation in scoring. Morrison was named the Co-National Player of the year for the 2005–06 season.

Since the mid-1990s, Gonzaga has established itself as a major basketball power in a mid-major conference. They have been to every NCAA tournament held since 1999, a year in which they made a Cinderella run to the Elite Eight, and have appeared in every final AP poll since the 2008–09 season. They have also appeared in every weekly poll since the start of the 2016–17 season, a streak of 115 consecutive weeks, good for the 13th longest streak in Men's Basketball history, as well as the longest active streak in the nation and the second longest by a Catholic institution behind Marquette, who was ranked for 166 consecutive polls from 1970-1980. They have also appeared in all but one WCC conference title game since 1995, and in every conference title game since 1998, winning 16 of them. This culminated in 2016–17, when the Bulldogs went to their first Final Four in school history, advancing to the national championship game, where they lost to North Carolina. They returned to the Final Four in 2021, losing in the final round to Baylor.

Team history

Early years
Gonzaga introduced a basketball program during the 1907–08 basketball season. In the 1908/09 season, George Varnell became the first official coach for Gonzaga, earning a  record during his only season with Gonzaga. Varnell was replaced by William Mulligan the following season, who acquired an  record. Frank McKevitt took over for Mulligan during the 1910–11 basketball season, acquiring an  record. That season also saw the team qualify for its first postseason tournament, the National Invitation Tournament (NIT),, while being led by point guard Geoff Goss, who averaged 12.6 points per game that season. In the following season, the fourth-seeded Bulldogs won the WCC tournament to secure their first appearance in the NCAA tournament.

Dan Monson (1997–1999)
In 1997, Gonzaga assistant coach Dan Monson, the son of veteran Oregon and Idaho head coach Don Monson, became the head coach of Gonzaga as Fitzgerald wanted to focus on his athletic director's duties. During his first season, Monson led the Zags to a 24–10 record and a WCC regular season title, which was not enough to land an at-large bid in the NCAA tournament. They earned a bid into the NIT and beat Wyoming 69–55 in the first round in Laramie, but fell at Hawai'i 78–70 in the second round.

During the 1998–99 season, the Bulldogs had a 28–7 record after winning the conference tournament, and were seeded tenth in the West regional of the NCAA tournament. In the tournament's "Cinderella" run and Gonzaga's "coming out party" (Gonzaga has made the NCAA tournament each year since) the Zags beat seventh-seeded Minnesota 75–63 in the first round in Seattle and followed it with an 82–74 win over second-seeded Stanford to advance to the regional semifinals in Phoenix. Gonzaga beat Florida 73–72 to advance to the regional finals after Casey Calvary tipped in the winning basket with four seconds remaining. They trailed eventual national champion UConn by one point with a minute remaining before losing 67–62 in the regional finals.

Mark Few (1999–present)

After Monson departed for Minnesota that summer, assistant coach Mark Few was promoted to head coach on July 26, 1999.

In his inaugural season, Few led the Zags to a 26–9 record, which was highlighted by winning the WCC tournament and advancing to the Sweet 16 of the NCAA tournament with wins over Louisville and St. John's in Tucson, Arizona.

In the 2000–01 season, the Bulldogs faced a tough schedule highlighted by games against Arizona, Washington, Florida, and New Mexico. Despite starting the season 5–1, the Zags dropped four of their next five games. Gonzaga rebounded and finished the regular season 15–6 before winning their third consecutive WCC tournament title. The win gave the Bulldogs an automatic bid into the NCAA tournament, where they were seeded twelfth in the South regional. In the first round in Memphis against fifth-seeded Virginia, Casey Calvary put back a blocked shot with nine seconds left to give the Zags an 86–85 victory. Gonzaga then beat 13th-seeded Indiana State 85–68 in the second round to advance to their third consecutive Sweet 16. In Atlanta, the Zags lost to defending national champion Michigan State 77–62 and finished the season with a 26–7 record.

Prior to the 2001–02 season, the Bulldogs were unanimously favored to win the WCC title in the WCC preseason coaches poll. Few led the Zags to a share of the WCC regular season title, as Pepperdine also had a 13–1 conference record. The Bulldogs would avenge their only conference loss of the season by defeating Pepperdine 96–90 for their fourth straight WCC tournament title. The win gave the Zags an automatic bid as a six-seed in the NCAA tournament, opening against 11th-seeded Wyoming. Despite beating the Cowboys four years earlier in the NIT, they lost 73–66, marking the first time the Zags lost in the first round of the tournament under Mark Few.

In the 2002–03 season, Few led the Bulldogs to their fifth regular season title in six years with a 12–2 conference record. Despite this, Gonzaga lost to San Diego in the WCC tournament championship game 72–63, marking the first time the Zags had lost in the championship game in four years. Gonzaga garnered a nine-seed in the 2003 NCAA tournament, where they beat Cincinnati 74–69 to advance to the second round of the tournament for the fourth time in five years. The Bulldogs would go on to lose to Arizona 96–95 in double overtime to finish 24–9.

The 2003–04 season marked the first time that the team participated in the annual Battle in Seattle game. Gonzaga faced third-ranked Missouri, who was the highest-ranked regular season opponent that the Zags had played against up to that point; they would go on to win the game in an 87–80 overtime victory. This season marked the last time Gonzaga would play home games in the Charlotte Y. Martin Centre; their last game in the building took place February 28, 2004, where they beat Santa Clara 80–64. The win gave the Bulldogs their first undefeated run through the WCC in school history with a 14–0 conference record. Gonzaga would go on to receive an automatic bid into the 2004 NCAA tournament with a two-seed, which was the highest seed they had received in school history in seven tournament appearances. The Bulldogs would go on to beat 15th-seeded Valparaiso 76–49 before being upset in the second round by tenth-seeded Nevada 91–72, where they finished the season 28–3.

Gonzaga opened up the 2004–05 season with a home game against Portland State in the new 6,000-seat McCarthey Athletic Center on November 19, 2004. Despite losing five seniors, including second-round NBA draft pick Blake Stepp, Few was still able to lead the Zags to their ninth regular season title since 1994 with a 12–2 conference record. The Bulldogs would go on to win their second straight WCC Tournament title, giving them an automatic bid into the 2005 NCAA tournament as a three-seed. The Zags beat 14th-seeded Winthrop 74–64 before falling to Texas Tech 71–69 in the second round, where they ended the season with a 26–5 record.

Before the 2005–06 season got underway, Gonzaga junior Adam Morrison became the first player in team history to be named to the preseason Associated Press All-America team. The Zags also received their highest preseason ranking in program history at number seven in the USA Today/ESPN preseason poll. The Bulldogs captured their third straight WCC Tournament title when they beat Loyola Marymount 68–67 in the championship game. They received an automatic bid into the 2006 NCAA tournament as a three-seed, where they beat Xavier 79–75 in the first round. The Zags would go on to beat Indiana Hoosiers 90–80, where they would advance to the Sweet 16 for the first time since 2001. Despite being ahead by as many as 17 points, the Bulldogs ended their season in the Sweet 16 by losing to UCLA 73–71, finishing 29–4.

The 2006–07 season marked the first time that the Zags suffered at least ten losses in a season since the 1997–98 season. Despite this, Few still led the Bulldogs to their seventh straight regular season title with a conference record of 11–3. Gonzaga would go on to win the WCC Tournament for the fourth year in a row, being the only Division I school to do so that year. They received an automatic bid into the 2007 NCAA tournament, where they were given a 10-seed. The Zags would end their season by losing in the opening round for the first time since 2001, as Indiana beat Gonzaga 70–57.

In 2007–08 the Bulldogs went 25–8, but lost in the Round of 64 as a #7 seed to a Davidson team that went to the Elite Eight as a #10 seed.

The 2008–09 team won both the WCC Regular Season Championship and the WCC Tournament Championship. Entering the NCAA tournament as a #4 seed, the team reached the Sweet Sixteen, before losing to eventual NCAA Champions North Carolina.

For the next five seasons, the team advanced to the NCAA tournament, but fell in the Round of 32 each time. The 2012–13 team became the first Gonzaga squad to be ranked as the #1 team in the country and was awarded as a #1 seed in the NCAA tournament for the first time. The Zags also won over 30 games for the first time in program history with a 32–3 overall record.

The  2014–15 team advanced all the way to the Elite Eight before losing to eventual national champion Duke. This was the first time since 1999 that Gonzaga had advanced to the Elite Eight. Gonzaga also won the WCC regular-season and tournament championships for the third consecutive season. The 2014–15 also set the school record for wins in a single season with 35.

The 2015–16 team suffered 4 losses at home and nearly missed the NCAA tournament entirely, but shared the WCC regular-season crown with Saint Mary's and then won the WCC Tournament. The Zags were awarded a #11 seed and advanced to the Sweet Sixteen, dismantling #6 seed Seton Hall and #3 seed Utah, before falling to Syracuse by three points.

The 2016–17 team won its first 29 games, setting a new school record for consecutive games won, before falling to WCC rival BYU. The Zags made the NCAA tournament as a #1 seed and advanced to the school's first-ever championship game, with wins over South Dakota State, Northwestern, West Virginia, Xavier, and South Carolina. The Zags set a new school record for wins in a single season with 37 and also had the most wins of any team that season.

The 2017–18 team also enjoyed success. Despite what was considered a "rebuilding year" after the Loss of Karnowski, Williams-Goss, Mathews and Collins among others (causing the Bulldogs to not be picked to win the West Coast Conference), the team won the WCC regular season title outright before winning the WCC tournament. In the NCAA tournament, the Bulldogs advanced to the Sweet Sixteen for the fourth consecutive year. They were ultimately bounced by Florida State, and finished the season at 32–5.

Near the end of that season, Gonzaga considered a potential move to the Mountain West Conference (MW) after nearly 40 years as a WCC member. When asked by a reporter from the San Diego Union-Tribune about rumored MW expansion plans, MW commissioner Craig Thompson confirmed that six schools had been considered, with Gonzaga being the only school he specifically named. A later Union-Tribune report indicated that talks were advanced enough that the conference's presidents planned a vote on an invitation to Gonzaga during the MW men's and women's basketball tournaments in Las Vegas, but decided to delay the vote until after the Final Four. The vote ultimately never took place, as Gonzaga athletic director Mike Roth notified both conferences during the Final Four that the school would remain in the WCC for the immediate future.
In the 2018 Maui Invitational Final on November 21, 2018 #3 Gonzaga defeated #1 Duke 89–87 for their first win over Duke and first win over a number 1 ranked team in team history.

The 2020–21 season would be a historic year for the team, going 26–0 in the regular season and being the final undefeated team in the country. They would earn the #1 overall seed in the tournament and cruise to the national championship game over Norfolk State, Oklahoma, Creighton, USC, and UCLA. In the national championship, their undefeated season came to an end, losing to Baylor 86–70.

Facilities

Basketball started at Gonzaga in February 1905 after a gymnasium was put in as an addition to the east end of the new college building that was being built. In 1955, the basketball team moved from the gymnasium, nicknamed "the cave", and began to play at the newly constructed Spokane Coliseum. On June 3, 1964, construction began for a new 3,800-seat athletic facility called the John F. Kennedy Memorial Pavilion. To raise money for the $1.1 million project, Gonzaga's student body had each student pay $10 per semester until $500,000 was raised. The university matched that amount, while the remaining $100,000 came from contributions. Gonzaga's first game in the pavilion took place on December 3, 1965 against Washington State, who beat the Bulldogs 106–78. In 1986, the facility was renamed the Charlotte Y. Martin Centre after an eponymous donor donated $4.5 million to finance a remodel of the arena that could hold up to 4,000 people.

After competing for over 39 years in the Charlotte Y. Martin Centre, Gonzaga trustees approved construction for a new 6,000-seat arena on April 11, 2003. The McCarthey Athletic Center was named after Gonzaga trustee Philip G. McCarthey and Gonzaga regent Thomas K. McCarthey, who contributed a significant portion of the funds needed to build the arena. The first official game took place on November 19, 2004 against Portland State, whom the Zags would beat 98–80 in front of a sold-out crowd. The Bulldogs opened the arena with a 38-game winning streak, which was the nation's longest active winning streak at the time. When combined with 12 wins at the Charlotte Y. Martin Centre, the overall home-game winning streak ended at 50 games with a loss to the Santa Clara on February 12, 2007. In February 2015, BYU snapped Gonzaga's 41-game home winning streak in the McCarthey Athletic Center, which was also the longest active home winning streak in the NCAA at the time.

Traditions

Battle in Seattle

On December 13, 2003, Gonzaga participated in a neutral court game at KeyArena that would later become an annual event known as the Battle in Seattle. The event marked the first time that a regular season Gonzaga basketball game was broadcast nationally on CBS Sports, as Craig Bolerjack called the action while Clark Kellogg provided commentary. Ranked third in the country, Missouri was the highest ranked regular season opponent that Gonzaga had faced up to that point; the Bulldogs would go on to beat the Tigers 87–80 in overtime.

The 2005 Battle in Seattle is remembered for Adam Morrison's game-winning shot against Oklahoma State that sealed a 64–62 victory for the Bulldogs. Gus Johnson's call at the end of the game with Bill Raftery was ranked fourth on a list of 25 of his most "over-the-top calls" by Complex. Johnson's call at the end of the game:

In 2008, the game broke the state attendance record for a regular season college basketball game, as a sold-out crowd of 16,763 watched the Bulldogs play Connecticut.

In the 2016–17 season, Gonzaga failed to schedule the Battle in Seattle, ending an annual tradition of participating in the event every December for 13 consecutive years. Representatives from the Zags cited an inability to find a quality opponent to schedule and wanting to maintain strong résumé. The Zags have compiled an  record in the event since they first appeared in it back in 2003.

Rivalries

Saint Mary's College (California) 

Gonzaga's biggest rivalry is with fellow West Coast Conference foe Saint Mary's. Many analysts and members of the media have touted the Gaels vs. Zags as one of the best, if not the best, college basketball rivalry on the West Coast, as both teams have been consistently the two top teams in the conference over the last 2 decades. Gonzaga and Saint Mary's have combined to win 19 out of the last 23 conference championship games (Gonzaga 17, San Diego 2, Saint Mary's 2). Currently Gonzaga leads the series 72–31.

University of Washington 

Gonzaga's most heated in-state rivalry is with Washington. They played a 10-year home-and-home series from 1997 to 2006, but  then it went dormant until 2015. In 2016, they began a new home-and-home series in Spokane and have agreed to continue the rivalry annually until at least the 2023–24 season. The Huskies lead the series 29–20, but the Zags have won 14 of the last 15 matchups, including the most recent game at Gonzaga on December 9, 2022, which the Zags won 77–60 over the Huskies.

Brigham Young University 

A notable rivalry with Brigham Young University (BYU) has developed throughout the past decade. BYU and Gonzaga first played on December 16, 1949 with Gonzaga winning 46–41.  The two teams would not meet again until March 19, 2011 in the third round of the NCAA tournament, as a BYU team led by Jimmer Fredette advanced to the Sweet Sixteen by defeating the Zags 89–67.  The following season, BYU left the Mountain West Conference and joined the West Coast Conference for the 2011–2012 season. Since then, Gonzaga has a 18–6 record against BYU.  However, BYU is one of few teams to win multiple times at the McCarthy Athletic Center in Spokane over the last decade, with wins at the Kennel in 2015, 2016 and 2017. BYU was the only team to beat #1 ranked Gonzaga during the 2016-17 regular season in which Gonzaga earned its first trip to the Final Four and National Championship game. BYU has played Gonzaga in the West Coast Conference tournament Final in 2014, 2015, 2018, and 2021 with Gonzaga winning all four of these matchups. Gonzaga leads the overall series 20–7, with the most recent meeting on March 9, 2021 in which Gonzaga won 88–78 in Las Vegas.

Impact

University enrollment
Freshman enrollment at Gonzaga in the mid-nineties hovered around 500 students annually, including a total of 569 as late as 1998. In 1999, enrollment jumped to 701 five months after the Zags went to the Elite Eight. This trend continued after Gonzaga won five games in the 1999 and 2000 NCAA tournaments, as freshman enrollment increased to 796 in 2000 and to a then-record 979 in 2001. A 65 percent increase in the size of the freshman class between 1997 and 2003 is part of a phenomenon called the Flutie effect, the increase in attention and applications for admission that results after a particularly notable and unexpected sporting victory by a school's athletic team.  Gonzaga University president Rev. Robert Spitzer said that the team's success was responsible for the school receiving the $23 million required to build the McCarthey Athletic Center, most of which was received through major gifts.

Gonzaga has been viewed as reaping benefits from its basketball-related exposure to this day. The university's financial position and fundraising success dramatically improved. This led to a campus building boom; the McCarthey Athletic Center proved to be just the first of a series of major campus buildings that opened between 2004 and 2017. Booming freshman enrollment led Gonzaga to introduce a more selective admissions process in 2003, which led to a significant increase in the academic credentials of incoming freshmen. Even with greater selectivity, freshman enrollment has continued to grow, reaching 1,200 for 2016–17.

Head coaching records

Season-by-season results

Under Mark Few:

Gonzaga vs. the AP Top 25 (since 1998–99)
Since the season of Gonzaga's 1999 NCAA Division I men's basketball tournament run to the Elite 8, Gonzaga has played a total of 115 games against teams ranked in the AP Top 25 Poll. Gonzaga has a record of  against such teams. They have beaten top-3 teams seven times in all, taking down #3 teams four times (Missouri in 2003–04, Georgia Tech and Oklahoma State in 2004–05, and Iowa in 2020–21), #2 twice (North Carolina in 2006–07 and UCLA in 2021–22), and #1 once (Duke in 2018–19).

Teams in bold represent games Gonzaga played in the NCAA Division I men's basketball tournament.

WCC Tournament results

Postseason

NCAA tournament
The Bulldogs have appeared in 23 NCAA tournaments. The COVID-19 pandemic caused the cancellation of the 2020 NCAA tournament, interrupting but not ending the Bulldogs' ongoing streak of 22 consecutive tournament appearances.

NCAA tournament seeding history
The NCAA began seeding the tournament with the 1979 edition.

NIT results
The Bulldogs have appeared in three National Invitation Tournaments (NIT).

Roster 
Note: Players' year is based on remaining eligibility. The NCAA did not count the 2020–21 season towards eligibility.
 Roster is subject to change as/if players transfer or leave the program for other reasons.

WCC and Big Sky Conference Awards

Conference Coach of the Year

WCC Player of the Year
See: WCC Player of the Year

WCC Defensive Player of the Year

1st-Team All-Conference

2nd-Team All-Conference

All-WCC Honorable Mention Team

WCC Tournament MVP
See: WCC tournament MVP

Conference All-Tournament Team

WCC Newcomer of the Year

WCC Freshman of the Year

WCC All-Freshmen Team

WCC Sixth Man of the Year

WCC Men's Scholar-Athlete of the Year

WCC All-Academic Team

WCC Honorable Mention All-Academic Team

National Awards

National Coach of the Year
 Mark Few (2017) AP, Naismith, Henry Iba Award, TSN, USA Today, NBC
 Mark Few (2021) NABC, Naismith

National Player of the Year
 Adam Morrison (2006) USBWA, NABC, CBS-Chevrolet, Oscar Robertson

Kareem Abdul-Jabbar Award (Best Center)
 Przemek Karnowski (2017)

Karl Malone Award (Best Power Forward)
 Drew Timme (2021)

Julius Erving Award (Best Small Forward)
 Rui Hachimura (2019)
 Corey Kispert (2021)

First Team All-American
 Dan Dickau (2002) AP, Wooden, USBWA, TSN
 Adam Morrison (2006) AP (unanimous), Wooden, USBWA, NABC, TSN
 Kelly Olynyk (2013) AP, Wooden, USBWA, NABC, TSN, SI, CBS
 Nigel Williams-Goss (2017) Wooden, USBWA, SI
 Rui Hachimura (2019) NABC, USBWA, TSN
 Corey Kispert (2021) AP, NABC, TSN, USBWA, Wooden

Second Team All-American
 Frank Burgess (1960, 1961) Helms, (1961) AP, TSN, NEA, NCAB
 Gary Lechman (1967) Helms
 Casey Calvary (2001) Wooden
 Dan Dickau (2002) NABC
 Blake Stepp (2004) AP, Wooden, USBWA, NABC, TSN
 Kyle Wiltjer (2015) Wooden, USBWA, NABC, SI, CBS
 Nigel Williams-Goss (2017) AP, NABC, TSN, USA Today, CBS, NBC, Fox
 Brandon Clarke (2019) Wooden, SI, CBS, NBC
 Rui Hachimura (2019) AP, Wooden, CBS
 Filip Petrušev (2020) Wooden, NABC, CBS
 Jalen Suggs (2021) AP, NABC, TSN, USBWA, Wooden
 Drew Timme (2021) AP, NABC, TSN, USBWA, Wooden

Third Team All-American
 Frank Burgess (1961) NABC, UPI
 Kevin Pangos (2015) AP, NABC, TSN, USA Today
 Kyle Wiltjer (2015) AP
 Domantas Sabonis (2016) CBS
 Brandon Clarke (2019) AP, TSN
 Rui Hachimura (2019) SI, NBC
 Filip Petrušev (2020) AP, USBWA, TSN, SI

Honorable Mention All-American
 Frank Burgess (1960) AP
 Bill Dunlap (1982) AP
 John Stockton (1984) AP, UPI
 Matt Santangelo (1999) AP
 Casey Calvary (2001) AP
 Blake Stepp (2003) AP
 Ronny Turiaf (2004, 2005) AP
 Adam Morrison (2005) AP
 JP Batista (2006) AP
 Derek Raivio (2007) AP
 Jeremy Pargo (2008) AP
 Matt Bouldin (2010) AP
 Domantas Sabonis (2016) AP, SI
 Kyle Wiltjer (2016)  AP
 Przemek Karnowski (2017) AP
 Johnathan Williams (2018) AP

Academic National Honors

CoSIDA Academic All-America Hall of Fame
 John Stockton (1984), Class of 2002

CoSIDA Academic All-American of the Year
 Jeff Brown (1994)
 Corey Kispert (2021)

Anson Mount Scholar-Athlete of the Year
 Jeff Brown (1994)

DI-AAA ADA Men's Scholar-Athlete of the Year
 Kelly Olynyk (2013)
 Kyle Wiltjer (2016)
 Nigel Williams-Goss (2017)

DI-AAA ADA Men's Scholar-Athlete Team
 Blake Stepp (2004)
 Kyle Bankhead (2004)
 Sean Mallon (2005, 2006, 2007)
 Kelly Olynyk (2013)
 Kevin Pangos (2015)
 Kyle Wiltjer (2016)
 Przemek Karnowski (2017)
 Nigel Williams-Goss (2017)
 Josh Perkins (2019)
 Corey Kispert (2021)

First Team CoSIDA Academic All-American
 Bryce McPhee (1985)
 Jarrod Davis (1992)
 Jeff Brown (1993, 1994)
 Dan Dickau (2002)
 Kelly Olynyk (2013)
 Nigel Williams-Goss (2017)
 Corey Kispert (2021)

Second Team CoSIDA Academic All-American
 Bryce McPhee (1984)
 John Stockton (1984)
 Jim McPhee (1990)
 Jarrod Davis (1991)
 Blake Stepp (2004)
 Domantas Sabonis (2016)

Third Team CoSIDA Academic All-American
 Scott Finnie (1978)
 Bryce McPhee (1983)
 Jeff Brown (1992)
 Blake Stepp (2003)

First Team Senior CLASS All-American

 Blake Stepp (2004)
 Kevin Pangos (2015)
 Przemek Karnowski (2017)
 Corey Kispert (2021)

Second Team Senior CLASS All-American
 Ronny Turiaf (2005)
 Matt Bouldin (2010)
 Kyle Wiltjer (2016)
 Johnathan Williams (2018)
 Josh Perkins (2019)

Elite 90 Award 
 Nigel Williams-Goss (2017)

McDonald's All-Americans
Eight McDonald's All-Americans have played for Gonzaga. Of these, five have started their college basketball careers with the Bulldogs—Zach Collins, Jalen Suggs, Hunter Sallis, Chet Holmgren, and Nolan Hickman. Suggs was selected for the 2020 McDonald's All-American game, which was canceled due to the COVID-19 pandemic. The 2021 McDonald's All-American game, to which Hickman and Holmgren were selected, was also canceled due to COVID-19.

5-Star Recruits
Twelve 5-star rated players have committed to Gonzaga, as rated in the final ranking projections by at least one major college basketball recruiting service (247Sports.com, ESPN.com, Rivals.com, and Scout.com). Among these players, eight began their college careers with the Bulldogs: Austin Daye, Domantas Sabonis, Zach Collins, Oumar Ballo, Jalen Suggs, Nolan Hickman, Chet Holmgren, and Hunter Sallis. Only Ballo did not make his debut immediately after his arrival at Gonzaga; he was to have debuted in the 2019–20 season, but was not academically cleared to play by the NCAA and was redshirted that season.

Players in the NBA
In this table, seasons at Gonzaga are categorized by the calendar years in which they end.

Retired numbers 

Gonzaga has retired four jersey numbers.

Statistical records
 Bold: Players expected to be active in the 2022–23 season.
 Updated through the 2021–22 season.

Individual career records

Career Points Leaders

Career Assists Leaders

Career Steals Leaders

Career Rebounds Leaders

Career Blocked Shots Leaders

Career 3-Point Field Goals Made Leaders

Career Field Goals Made Leaders

Career Free Throws Made Leaders

Career Field Goal Percentage Leaders
 Minimum 200 field goals attempted

Career Free Throw Percentage Leaders
 Minimum 100 free throws attempted

Career Wins Leaders

Career Games Played Leaders

Individual season records

Single-Season Points Leaders

Single-Season Assists Leaders

Single-Season Steals Leaders

Single-Season Rebounds Leaders

Single-Season Blocked Shots Leaders

Single-Season 3-Pointers Made Leaders

Single-Season Field Goals Made Leaders

Single-Season Free Throws Made Leaders

Single-Season Field Goal Percentage Leaders
 Minimum 2 field goals made per game

Single-Season Free Throw Percentage Leaders
 Minimum 2 free throws made per game

Footnotes

References

Works cited

External links 
 

 
Basketball teams established in 1907
1907 establishments in Washington (state)